Hœrdt is a commune in the Bas-Rhin department in Grand Est in north-eastern France.

Geography
Hœrdt is positioned between Strasbourg and Haguenau, a short distance to the south-east of Brumath.   The commune is traversed by departmental road RD 37 which leads to Bischwiller some ten kilometres (six miles) to the north and from where it is possible to access the Autoroute A35 north-south autoroute connecting Strasbourg with Ludwigshafen (subject to a ten-minute stretch on single carriageway road to the north of the frontier).   Hœrdt is also served by a local rail service.

Economy
Agriculture is important to the local economy: the main crop is, famously, asparagus.

Sport
Sports lovers are served by various facilities:
 Strasbourg-Hoerdt Horse racing circuit
 Municipal football stadium and culture centre
 Table tennis: The Hœrdt Table Tennis association, enjoys enthusiastic support locally. It is affiliated to the FFTT (French Table Tennis federation).

See also
 Communes of the Bas-Rhin department

References

Communes of Bas-Rhin
Bas-Rhin communes articles needing translation from French Wikipedia